"My Dream" is a 2010 English language debut song by Danish singer Thomas Ring Petersen who won the third Danish series of The X Factor on 27 March 2010. The competition winner's song was written by season's three judges, Soulshock, Pernille Rosendahl and Remee and former News drummer Peter Biker. It describes the journey that the participants have been on. The song was sung by the three finalists Thomas, Tine and Jesper for the finals. The song was released immediately after the broadcast of the finals as a digital download.

Track listing

Chart performance
On 2 April 2010 the song debuted at number 1 on the Danish Single Chart, staying at the top of the charts for 2 weeks.

Release history

References

2010 singles
Number-one singles in Denmark
Songs written by Soulshock
Songs written by Remee
2010 songs